Suono Libero is a two-disc album released by Gigi D'Agostino in 2008. It contains many remixes of previous works, including L'Amour Toujours, Another Way, La Passion, Bla Bla Bla (titled "La Danza Del Sole"), The Riddle and L'Uomo Sapiente (titled "L'uomo Dei Fenomeni").

The first disc is mostly Italodance while the second is mostly Lento Violento.

Track listing

CD 1
Gigi D'Agostino - "L'Amour Toujours" [Forte Forte]
Gigi D'Agostino - "Casa Dag"
Gigi D'Agostino - "Another Way" [Angeli In Festa]
Gigi D'Agostino - "La Passion" [Angeli In Festa]
Gigi D'Agostino - "La Danza Del Sole"
Gigi D'Agostino - "The Riddle" [Get Up]
Gigi D'Agostino - "Inventi"
Gigi D'Agostino - "A Volte Io Mi Perdo"
Gigi D'Agostino - "Io Vorrei Non Vorrei Ma Se Vuoi"
Gigi D'Agostino - "Pioggia E Sole"
Gigi D'Agostino - "Sertirsi Così"
Mr. Dendo - "Il Trip Del Vagabondo"
Luca Noise - "Magic Of Love" [Gigi D'Agostino & Luca Noise Sintesi Mix]
Gigi D'Agostino - "Indiano Dag"
Gigi D'Agostino - "Walking"
Gigi D'Agostino - "Casa Dag" [Au-uon]
Gigi D'Agostino - "Magia"

CD 2
Gigi D'Agostino - "Paese In Festa"
Gigi D'Agostino - "Narcotic"
Dottor Dag - "Evviva Le Nana"
Dottor Dag - "Intendo Dire"
Dottor Dag - "Mi Sono Capito"
Dottor Dag - "L'uomo Dei Fenomeni"
Dottor Dag - "Paciocco"
Dottor Dag - "Save The Rap" [Impiccio Mix]
Dottor Dag - "Legnata Distorta"
Dottor Dag - "Quoting" [Mani A Destra Mani A Sinistra Mix]
Dottor Dag - "Pomp"
Dottor Dag - "Però"
Dottor Dag - "Capocantiere"
Dottor Dag - "Comunitensa"
Dottor Dag - "La Ninna Nanna"
Dottor Dag - "Esercizio Del Braccio"
Dottor Dag - "Musicore"
Dottor Dag - "Believe"
Dottor Dag - "Materasso Dag"
Dottor Dag - "Grattino Dag"
Tarro Noise & Zarro Dag - "In To The Bam" [Settore Terziario]
Dottor Dag - "Mi Sta Sulla Cassa"
Dottor Dag - "Distorsione Dag" [Lussazione Mix]

References

Gigi D'Agostino albums
2008 albums